A pension buyout (alternatively buy-out) is a type of financial transfer whereby a pension fund sponsor (such as a large company) pays a fixed amount in order to free itself of any liabilities (and assets) relating to that fund. The other party, usually an insurer, receives the payment but takes on responsibility for meeting those liabilities. 

This type of buyout, known as a Section 32 Buyout, was introduced in the UK in the early 1980’s.

Since the liabilities associated with a fund, particularly those associated with defined benefit schemes, are not known precisely at the time of the buyout (as they depend upon how long the members live and investment returns on the fund assets among other factors), the transaction is regarded as a form of de-risking for the sponsor. From 2006 onwards, buyouts of this sort have become increasingly popular in both the United States and the United Kingdom.  

Pensioner buy-ins are an alternative to pension buy-outs where the financial contract is retained within the pension fund for the benefit of all members not just those members whose benefits are covered by the contract. Pensioner buy-ins are particularly popular in the United Kingdom as they benefit from more favourable accounting treatment and require a lower cash injection from the sponsor. 
 
As of 2014, insurers involved in the market in the United Kingdom include Aviva, Legal & General, Pension Insurance Corporation, Prudential and Rothesay, while notable sponsors who have recently sought to offload their risk include Verizon and General Motors in the United States and Akzo Nobel and TotalEnergies in the United Kingdom.

References

Pension funds
Financial risk management